Université Félix Houphouët-Boigny (UFHB) (formerly known as University of Cocody-Abidjan, fr.: Université de Cocody or Université de Cocody-Abidjan) is an institution of higher education located in the Cocody section of Abidjan and the largest in Côte d'Ivoire.  With over 50,000 students, the UFHB has 13 faculties and several research centers providing diplomas from two-year undergraduate to professional academic, medical, legal, and specialist degrees. From 1964 to 1996, it remained the main campus of the national University of Abidjan system. It is state owned and operated by the Ministry of Higher Education and Scientific Research. In 2008, it had 53,700 students.

History

UCA was an outgrowth of two French founded institutions from 1958. The Ecole des Lettres d’Abidjan (E.L.A.) founded in October 1958, under the joint administration of the University of Dakar and the Ivorian education directorate ("Direction de l’enseignement de Côte d’Ivoire"). Founded on the same date was the Abidjan Center for Higher Education ("Centre d’enseignement supérieur d’Abidjan").

On 9 January 1964 the government of Côte d'Ivoire fused the institutions and promoted them to the rank of university. The public university system was, until reorganization in 1996, known as the University of Abidjan, with the University of Abidjan-Cocody as the largest of three campuses.

In the reorganization of August 1996, each of the three main campuses became independent universities, accountable directly to the Ivorian Ministry of Education. (The three are the Université d'Abobo-Adjamé, the Université de Bouaké, and the Université de Cocody.) At this time the "Faculties" were re-designated "Unités de formation et de recherche" (UFR) or "Research and Training Units" (RTU). The university consisted of 13 UFRs and one "Center". The number of special research centers and institutes have since expanded. In 2008 there were two Autonomous Research Centers in Social Sciences and Mathematics, as well as ten institutes of advanced study.

In 1971, students at the university founded the Pupils and Students Trade Union of Côte d'Ivoire (Union Syndicale des Elèves et Etudiants de Côte d'Ivoire or USEEECI) in protest of the regime-sponsored Students and Pupils Movement of Côte d'Ivoire (MEECI).

The institution's name was changed to Université Félix Houphouët-Boigny in August 2012.

Faculties

FLASH
In 1971, the School of Letters (formerly the E.L.A.) became the "Faculté des Lettres, Arts et Sciences Humaines" (FLASH). In 1977, the Department of History, for example, moved from offering only undergraduate courses ("Premier cycle") and began to offer "Deuxième cycle" and "Troisième cycle" diplomas (Master's degrees and PhD).

Autonomous research centers
 Centre Ivoirien de Recherche Economique et Social (CIRES), Ivorian center of economics and social sciences
 Institut de Recherches Mathématiques (IRMA), Institute of mathematics

Other institutes and centers
Centre National de Floristique (CNF)
Centre Universitaire de Recherche d’Application en Télédétection (CURAT)
Institut de Géographie Tropicale (IGT)
Institut d’Histoire, d’Arts et d’Archéologie-Africains (IHAAA)
Institut d’Ethno-Sociologie (IES )
Centre de Recherche Architecturales et Urbaines (CRAU)
Centre Ivoirien d’Enseignement et de Recherche en Psychologie Appliquée (CIERPA)
Institut de Recherche, d’Expérimentation et d’Enseignement en Pédagogie (IREEP)
Institut de Linguistique Appliquée (ILA)
Institut des Sciences Anthropologiques du développement (ISAD)

Notable faculty 

Gilbert Aké
Gladys Anoma
Séry Bailly
Tanella Boni
Wadja Egnankou
Joséphine Guidy Wandja
Timpoko Helène Kienon-Kabore
Yacouba Konaté
Ramata Ly-Bakayoko
Jacqueline Oble

Notable alumni
Yvonne Libona Bonzi Coulibaly

See also
Université d'Abobo-Adjamé

References
Notes

Bibliography
Akira Sato, Manso Lasm, & Adiko Aimee. Inventaire de L'Enseignement Superieur en Cote D'Ivoire. The Africa Research Series No. 08, Institute of Developing Economies, Japan External Trade Organization (IDE-JETRO). (2003)

External links

Official site

Felix Houphouet-Boigny
Organizations based in Abidjan
Educational institutions established in 1964
Buildings and structures in Abidjan
1964 establishments in Ivory Coast